Yassin Moutaouakil (born 18 July 1986) is a French footballer who plays for Hayes & Yeading United. He plays as a right back and has represented France at Under-19 and Under-21 levels.

Career

Club career

Early career
Moutaouakil was born in Nice. He began his career at Ligue 2 club Châteauroux, making his debut for the senior team in the 2004–05 season. In his time with Châteauroux, Moutaouakil made 36 appearances, including one appearance in the 2004–05 UEFA Cup.

Charlton
On 20 June 2007, he signed a four-year contract with Charlton Athletic for a fee of about €600,000, following reported interest from Everton, Aston Villa, Rangers, Celtic and Lazio. Shortly after joining Charlton, he soon suffered an ankle injury. Moutaouakil failed to settle in the side. Charlton Athletic released their season's squad numbers on 5 August, with no number being allocated to either Moutaouakil or teammate Martin Christensen.

Over the 2009 summer break, Moutaouakil joined Portsmouth on a trial basis. He played in a number of pre season friendlies but did not join permanently. Moutaouakil was also linked with a return to France by joining Le Havre on loan but that also didn't happen. On the last day of the UK summer transfer window, Moutaouakil joined Motherwell on a six-month loan deal. After joining Motherwell, Moutaouakil revealed that Rangers defender Madjid Bougherra had convinced him to join a Scottish club. However, on 2 January 2010, he returned to Charlton Athletic after three-and-a-half months at Fir Park. On 4 June 2010, the club announced that Moutaouakil's contract had been mutually terminated.

Trials and Hayes & Yeading
In the summer of 2010, Moutaouakil went on trial at Swansea City. On 12 January 2011, it was announced that Yassin was on trial with Oldham Athletic.

In August 2011, Moutaouakil signed with Hayes & Yeading United in a bid to revive his career. On 17 December 2011, Moutaouakil made his club début in a 1–1 draw with Barrow. In November 2012, Moutaouakil revealed he had nearly joined Millwall in the summer transfer window In April 2012, Moutaouakil suffered an ankle injury, ruling him out for two weeks. On 20 November, he scored his first career goal, against Chelmsford City.

Portsmouth
In January 2013, he was close to joining Luton Town but signed for Portsmouth instead, on 24 January. Two days later, he made his Pompey debut, in a 1–3 home loss against Hartlepool United. On 9 May 2013, he signed a new one-year contract with Pompey following the club's relegation to League Two.

Return to Hayes and Yeading
In summer 2016, Moutaoukil re-joined Hayes and Yeading in the Southern League Premier Division.

International career
Moutaoukil was born in France and is of Moroccan descent. Moutaouakil has played for France at Under-19 and Under-21 levels. With the Under-19s, he won the 2005 UEFA European Under-19 Football Championship in July 2005. He has five Under-21 caps with France, and has also captained the side as well as playing in the 2007 Toulon Tournament.

Career statistics

References

External links
Yassin Moutaouakil 2008–09 season profile at cafc.co.uk

1986 births
Living people
Footballers from Nice
French footballers
France under-21 international footballers
French sportspeople of Moroccan descent
French expatriate footballers
Association football defenders
LB Châteauroux players
Charlton Athletic F.C. players
Motherwell F.C. players
Hayes & Yeading United F.C. players
Portsmouth F.C. players
English Football League players
Scottish Premier League players
Expatriate footballers in Scotland
Expatriate footballers in England
France youth international footballers